Omethidae is a family of Elateroidea sometimes known as the false soldier beetles. They are native to South, Southeast and Eastern Asia and the Americas. Their biology is obscure and their larvae are unknown. They appear to inhabit vegetation in or surrounding forests, and are probably active during the day.

Classification and taxonomy
There are some 40 species in 11 genera, divided into four subfamilies. Long-lipped beetles (Telegeusinae) were formerly treated as a family Telegeusidae but are most recently treated as a subfamily within Omethidae. According to other recent studies, Phengodidae might possibly include (or be sister taxon to) the telegeusines.

Subfamily Driloniinae
Drilonius

Subfamily Matheteinae
Ginglymocladus
Matheteus

Subfamily Omethinae
Blatchleya
Malthomethes
Omethes
Symphyomethes
Troglomethes

Subfamily Telegeusinae
Pseudokarumia
Pseudotelegeusis
Telegeusis

References

Elateroidea
Beetle families